James H. "Trey" Freeman III (born October 12, 1992) is an American professional basketball player for Šibenka of the Croatian League. He played college basketball for Old Dominion University and Campbell University.

High school career
Freeman attended Floyd E. Kellam High School where he averaged 20 points, 5.1 rebounds, 4.8 assists and 1.9 steals per game while shooting 60.5 percent from the field, 49.1 percent from 3-point territory as a senior, leading the Knights to the Beach District regular season and tournament championships with a 27–0 record. For his efforts, he was named Beach District Player of the Year and first-team all-district as well as to the Virginian-Pilot All-Tidewater First Team.

College career
Freeman originally committed to Campbell. As a freshman, he averaged 13.9 points and 3.8 assists per game and was named the Big South Conference Freshman of the Year. After a strong sophomore season, Freeman elected to transfer to Old Dominion. He applied for a waiver of the NCAA (NCAA) transfer redshirt rule, but his waiver was denied. Freeman had two productive seasons at Old Dominion, earning first-team All-Conference USA honors both seasons. For his career, Freeman scored 2,000 points.

Professional career
After going undrafted in the 2016 NBA draft, Freeman joined the Houston Rockets for the 2016 NBA Summer League. On September 26, 2016, he signed with the Detroit Pistons, but was waived on October 22 after appearing in one preseason game. On October 30, he was acquired by the Grand Rapids Drive of the NBA Development League as an affiliate of the Pistons.

On July 4, 2017, Freeman entered Baloncesto Superior Nacional (BSN) in Puerto Rico for the Mayagüez Indios.

On August 5, 2020, Freeman signed with Šibenka of the Croatian League.

Personal life
The son of James and Dr. Miriam Freeman, he has one sister, Shawna, and two brothers, Aric and Adrian. He majored in sport management.

References

External links
Old Dominion Monarchs bio
Campbell Fighting Camels bio

1992 births
Living people
Basketball players from Virginia
Campbell Fighting Camels basketball players
Grand Rapids Drive players
Old Dominion Monarchs men's basketball players
Point guards
Shooting guards
Sportspeople from Virginia Beach, Virginia
American men's basketball players
GKK Šibenik players